Georg Skarstedt (31 January 1900 – 8 December 1976) was a Swedish actor. He appeared in more 120 films between 1920 and 1969.

Selected filmography

 The People of Norrland (1930)
 A Night of Love by the Öresund (1931)
 International Match (1932)
 Lucky Devils (1932)
 Boman's Boy (1933)
 Simon of Backabo (1934)
 The Marriage Game (1935)
 Ocean Breakers (1935)
 Conflict (1937)
 The Andersson Family (1937)
 Adolf Strongarm (1937)
 Storm Over the Skerries (1938)
 Kiss Her! (1940)
 Only a Woman (1941)
 Captured by a Voice (1943)
 Blizzard (1944)
 Motherhood (1945)
 Black Roses (1945)
 The Rose of Tistelön (1945)
 Harald the Stalwart (1946)
 The Poetry of Ådalen (1947)
 Maria (1947)
 Neglected by His Wife (1947)
 The People of Simlang Valley (1947)
 Music in Darkness (1948)
Sin (1948)
 Robinson in Roslagen (1948)
 On These Shoulders (1948)
 Foreign Harbour (1948)
 Lars Hård (1948)
 Vagabond Blacksmiths (1949)
 Big Lasse of Delsbo (1949)
 Woman in White (1949)
 Son of the Sea (1949)
 Restaurant Intim (1950)
 The Motor Cavaliers (1950)
 When Love Came to the Village (1950)
 The Kiss on the Cruise (1950)
 The Quartet That Split Up (1950)
 Perhaps a Gentleman (1950)
 Stronger Than the Law (1951)
 In the Arms of the Sea (1951)
 Summer with Monika (1952)
 She Came Like the Wind (1952)
 Kalle Karlsson of Jularbo (1952)
 Dance, My Doll (1953)
 Simon the Sinner (1954)
 Storm Over Tjurö (1954)
 The Vicious Breed (1954)
 Enchanted Walk (1954)
 Paradise (1955)
 Voyage in the Night (1955)
 Uncle's (1955)
 Darling of Mine (1955)
 The Light from Lund (1955)
 The Dance Hall (1955)
 The Girl in Tails (1956)
 Laughing in the Sunshine (1956)
 Night Child (1956)
 Encounters in the Twilight (1957)
 Bill Bergson Lives Dangerously (1957)
 Miss April (1958)
 A Goat in the Garden (1958)
 Åsa-Nisse in Military Uniform (1958)
 The Great Amateur (1958)
 On a Bench in a Park (1960)
 Two Living, One Dead (1961)
 Ticket to Paradise (1962)
 Hide and Seek (1963)
 Äktenskapsbrottaren (1964)
 The Bookseller Gave Up Bathing (1969)

References

External links

1900 births
1976 deaths
Swedish male film actors
People from Falun
20th-century Swedish male actors